The 1959–60 Duke Blue Devils men's basketball team represented Duke University in the 1959–60 NCAA Division I men's basketball season. The head coach was Vic Bubas and the team finished the season with an overall record of 17–11.

References

Duke Blue Devils men's basketball seasons
Duke
1959 in sports in North Carolina
1960 in sports in North Carolina